The Church of Scotland has a Presbyterian structure, which means it is organised under a hierarchy of courts. Traditionally there were four levels of courts: the Kirk Session (at congregational level), the Presbytery (at local area level), the Synod (at a regional level) and the General Assembly (the Church's highest court). However, the synods were abolished in the early 1990s.

Scottish local government was reorganised in 1975, creating a new system of regions and districts to replace the long-standing counties and burghs. The General Assembly of the Church of Scotland also ordered a major reorganisation of presbyteries in the mid-1970s, redrawing presbytery boundaries to make them broadly contiguous with the then-new local government boundaries. An example was the union of the former Presbyteries of Cupar and St Andrews, creating a new Presbytery of St Andrews (which also included the Parishes of Newport-on-Tay, Wormit and Tayport, previously in the Presbytery of Dundee). This new Presbytery's boundaries mirrored the North East Fife District Council.

Following further local government reorganisation in the 1990s (replacing regions and districts with a single-tier system of councils), it was proposed to further considerably reduce the number of Presbyteries (possibly to as few as seven). This proposal was rejected by the General Assembly. Since 2003 several presbyteries have voluntarily sought permission to merge, as described below. Despite these mergers the existing Presbytery numbering system is being retained, albeit now with some gaps.

It is the presbyteries which have oversight of parishes and pastoral responsibility for parish ministers, and the Kirk Sessions of the individual parishes are subordinated to them. A parish minister is answerable to the Presbytery, not to the Kirk Session. The following is a list of presbyteries, arranged according to historical synod, and with the presbytery code number from the Church of Scotland Yearbook.

The Church of Scotland is currently in a process of consultations with the aim of reducing the number of presbyteries to around 12.
The current completed mergers, as at February 2021, are as follows:

On 1 June 2020 the presbyteries of Aberdeen and Shetland merged to form the Presbytery of Aberdeen and Shetland ( with Shetland reducing its parishes to one )
On 1 September 2020 the presbyteries of Dumbarton and Greenock and Paisley merged becoming the Presbytery of The Clyde.
On 1 January 2021 the presbyteries of St Andrews,  Kirkcaldy and Dunfermline merged becoming the Presbytery of Fife.

Synods

Synod of Lothian
1. Presbytery of Edinburgh 
2. Presbytery of West Lothian
3. Presbytery of Lothian

Synod of The Borders
4. Presbytery of Melrose and Peebles 
5. Presbytery of Duns 
6. Presbytery of Jedburgh

Synod of Dumfries and Galloway
7. Presbytery of Annandale and Eskdale 
8. Presbytery of Dumfries and Kirkcudbright 
9. Presbytery of Wigtown and Stranraer

Synod of Ayr
10. Presbytery of Ayr 
11. Presbytery of Irvine and Kilmarnock 
12. Presbytery of Ardrossan

Synod of Clydesdale
13. Presbytery of Lanark 
14. Presbytery of The Clyde.
15. Presbytery of Glasgow 
16. Presbytery of Hamilton

Synod of Argyll
17. Presbytery of Argyll , created by the 2004 merger of:
Presbytery of South Argyll
Presbytery of Dunoon
Presbytery of Lorn and Mull

Synod of Forth
18. Presbytery of Falkirk 
19. Presbytery of Stirling

Synod of Fife
 20. As of 1 January 2021 there is only one presbytery covering the whole of Fife.

Synod of Perth and Angus
21. Presbytery of Dunkeld and Meigle
22. Presbytery of Perth 
23. Presbytery of Dundee 
24. Presbytery of Angus

Synod of Grampian
25. Presbytery of Aberdeen and Shetland 
26. Presbytery of Kincardine and Deeside 
27. Presbytery of Gordon 
28. Presbytery of Buchan 
29. Presbytery of Moray

Synod of The Southern Highlands
30. Presbytery of Abernethy
31. Presbytery of Inverness  
32. Presbytery of Lochaber

Synod of Ross, Sutherland and Caithness
33. Presbytery of Ross 
34. Presbytery of Sutherland
35. Presbytery of Caithness 
36. Presbytery of Lochcarron and Skye
37. Presbytery of Uist
38. Presbytery of Lewis

Presbyteries not formally part of any Synod
39. Presbytery of Orkney 
40. Presbytery of England
41. International Presbytery  (known as Presbytery of Europe until 2016)
42. Presbytery of Jerusalem

External links

 
 
Scotland, Church of
Scotland